10247 Amphiaraos  is Jupiter trojan from the Greek camp, approximately  in diameter. It was discovered on 24 September 1960, by Dutch astronomers Ingrid and Cornelis van Houten at Leiden, and Tom Gehrels at the Palomar Observatory in California. The X/D-type asteroid has a long rotation period of 34.26 hours and possibly an elongated shape. It was named after the seer Amphiaraus (Amphiaraos) from Greek mythology.

Orbit and classification 

Amphiaraos is a Jovian asteroid orbiting in the leading Greek camp at Jupiter's  Lagrangian point, 60° ahead of the Gas Giant's orbit in a 1:1 resonance (see Trojans in astronomy). It is a non-family asteroid in the Jovian background population. It orbits the Sun at a distance of 5.2–5.3 AU once every 12 years and 1 month (4,410 days; semi-major axis of 5.26 AU). Its orbit has an eccentricity of 0.01 and an inclination of 4° with respect to the ecliptic. The body's observation arc begins with its official discovery observation at Palomar in September 1960.

Palomar–Leiden survey 

The survey designation "P-L" stands for Palomar–Leiden, named after Palomar Observatory and Leiden Observatory, which collaborated on the fruitful Palomar–Leiden survey in the 1960s. Gehrels used Palomar's Samuel Oschin telescope (also known as the 48-inch Schmidt Telescope), and shipped the photographic plates to Ingrid and Cornelis van Houten at Leiden Observatory where astrometry was carried out. The trio are credited with the discovery of several thousand asteroid discoveries.

Physical characteristics 

Amphiaraos has been characterized as an X and D-type asteroid in the SDSS-based taxonomy, and by Pan-STARRS' survey. It is also an assumed C-type.

Rotation period 

In March 2012, a rotational lightcurve of Amphiaraos was obtained from photometric observations by Robert Stephens, Daniel Coley and Ralph Megna at the Goat Mountain Astronomical Research Station  in California. Lightcurve analysis gave a longer-than average rotation period of 34.26 hours with a brightness amplitude of 0.55 magnitude.

Diameter and albedo 

According to the survey carried out by the NEOWISE mission of NASA's Wide-field Infrared Survey Explorer, Amphiaraos measures 26.83 kilometers in diameter and its surface has an albedo of 0.098, while the Collaborative Asteroid Lightcurve Link assumes a standard albedo for a carbonaceous asteroid of 0.057 and calculates a diameter of 33.54 kilometers based on an absolute magnitude of 11.1.

Naming 

This minor planet was named after the Greek seer Amphiaraus (Amphiaraos), who was the king of Argos. He was one of the Seven against Thebes. The official  was published by the Minor Planet Center on 24 January 2000.

References

External links 
 Asteroid Lightcurve Database (LCDB), query form (info )
 Dictionary of Minor Planet Names, Google books
 Discovery Circumstances: Numbered Minor Planets (10001)-(15000) – Minor Planet Center
 
 

010247
010247
Discoveries by Cornelis Johannes van Houten
Discoveries by Ingrid van Houten-Groeneveld
Discoveries by Tom Gehrels
6629
Named minor planets
19600924